Catholic University of Eastern Africa (CUEA) is a multi-campus private university in Kenya. It is accredited by the Commission for University Education in Kenya.

Location
The main campus of the university is located along Bogani East Road, in the neighborhood called Langata, a southwestern neighborhood, within the city of Nairobi, the capital and largest city of Kenya. The geographical coordinates of the university campus are:
1°21'04.0"S, 36°45'28.0"E (Latitude:-1.351111; Longitude:36.757778).

History
Catholic University of East Africa founded on 3 September 1984, as a graduate school of theology, under the name the Catholic Higher Institute of Eastern Africa (CHIEA). The institute was founded by the regional ecclesiastical authority known as Association of Member Episcopal Conferences of Eastern Africa (AMECEA). The institution would be formally opened by Pope John Paul II on 18 August 1985, and in 1986 the Graduate School of Theology would start negotiations with the Commission for Higher Education in Kenya to establish the current University.

In 1989, the institute obtained a "Letter of Interim Authority" as the first step towards its establishment as a private university. After three years of intensive negotiations between the Authority of the Graduate School of Theology (CHIEA) and the Commission for Higher Education, the Faculty of Arts and Social Sciences was established. The climax of the negotiations was a granting of the Civil Charter to CHIEA on 3 November 1992. This marked the birth of the university as a private institution. The institute rebranded as the Catholic University of Eastern Africa, in 1992.

In 2002, the Faculties of Science and Commerce were established, followed by the Center for Social Justice and Ethics in 2003, the Faculty of Law in 2004, and the School of Continuing Professional Development in 2009. Satellite campuses would also be opened in Eldoret and Kisumu in the same year. In April 2013, the university opened a new campus in I&M Tower, along Kenyatta Avenue, in Nairobi's central business district. The campus can accommodate up to 500 students.

Learning Resource Centre
The university hosts an environment-friendly Learning Resource Centre (LRC) as an example of ecologically sustainable design in the region. Designed by Kenyan architect Musau Kimeu, the LRC consists of three buildings—a 3000-seat modern library, a 1200-seat state-of-the-art auditorium and a 500-seat cafeteria. The buildings are arranged around a 50m by 40m central square and tied together by a covered walkway with outdoor seating. The central area of the grass-covered square is adorned on opposite corners with a fountain and a three-metre high statue of Pope Paul VI by Ugandan artist Leonard Kateete.

The sustainable design shared by the three buildings include the use of natural ventilation to provide cooling, use of high thermal mass, sun-shading of glazed areas and building orientation. Wind energy is utilised in operating the ventilation cowls above the thermal chimneys with an underground water storage tank whose top doubles up as the podium for an outdoor amphitheatre being incorporated for water harvesting. The building was recognized as the Best Green Building in Kenya in 2014.

Academics
As of May 2020, the university maintains the following faculties, schools and institutes:

 Faculty of Arts and Social Sciences
 Faculty of Education
 Faculty of Law
 Faculty of Science
 Faculty of Theology
 School of Business
 School of Graduate Studies
 Institute of Canon Law
 Institute of Regional Integration and Development (IRID)
 Center for Social Justice and Ethics (CSJE)
 Library and Information Science
 Open Distance and e-Learning (ODEL)
All the faculties, schools and institutes are found in various halls within the university with the Faculty of Law separately based at Kozlowiecki Hall outside the main campus.

Cardinal Otunga Scholarship Fund
The university runs the Cardinal Otunga Scholarship Fund in honour of one of the university's founding fathers, Maurice Cardinal Michael Otunga. The aim of the fund is to sponsor needy but deserving students in pursuit of their studies at the university. The scholarship fund governance framework consists of two committees, namely the Fund Steering Committee and the Scholarship Awards Committee. The Steering Committee organizes an annual Cardinal Otunga Memorial Mass, the Lecture and the Scholarship Fundraiser whereas the Awards Committee administers the funds to deserving students.

Constituent and Affiliated colleges
 Marist International University College
 Tangaza University College
 Hekima University College
 Regina Pacis University College
 Uzima University College
In addition to constituent colleges there are a number of affiliated colleges namely;
 Don Bosco College: Moshi, Tanzania
 Christ the King Major Seminary
 The Spiritan Seminary
 AMECEA Pastoral Institute
 Chemichemi ya Uzima Center

Notable alumni
Notable alumni include:
 Stella Kilonzo, Executive Director of the Capital Markets Authority of Kenya; July 2008 – June 2012.
Eve D'Souza, Media personality
George Khaniri, Senator, Vihiga County
Vanessa Mdee, Tanzanian singer
Emmanuel Mosoti, Lead of the Health Sector Development Partner Forum
Rachel Ruto, First Lady of the Republic of Kenya
Alexander Otieno Oketch, Regional Projects Development Director, General Electric
Jackson Mandago, Senator of Uasin Gishu County
Elizabeth Lenjo, Intellectual Property Lawyer and Lecturer
Awut Deng Acuil, Former Minister of Foreign Affairs and International Cooperation, South Sudan
Samantha Mugatsia, Kenyan actress
Uwem Akpan, Nigerian writer
Margaret Mwachanya, Commissioner, Independent Electoral and Boundaries Commission of Kenya
Betty Korir, Kenyan Lawyer and Corporate Executive, Credit Bank
Doreen Majala, Kenyan Lawyer and media personality
Tuta Mionki, Kenyan rally driver, co-driver and navigator
John Baptist Odama, Catholic Archbishop of Gulu, Uganda

See also

 Education in Kenya
 List of universities in Kenya

References

External links
 Website of Catholic University of Eastern Africa

Catholic universities and colleges in Africa
Catholic University of Eastern Africa
Educational institutions established in 1984
1984 establishments in Kenya
Private universities and colleges in Kenya